Caecilia albiventris is a species of caecilian in the family Caeciliidae. It is endemic to Suriname. Its natural habitats are tropical moist lowland forests, plantations, rural gardens, and heavily degraded former forest.

References

albiventris
Endemic fauna of Suriname
Amphibians described in 1803
Taxonomy articles created by Polbot